The 2010–11 Serbian SuperLiga (known as the Jelen SuperLiga for sponsorship reasons) was the fifth season of the Serbian SuperLiga, the top football league of Serbia, since its establishment in 2006. It began on 14 August 2010 and ended on 29 May 2011. A total of sixteen teams contested the league.

Partizan successfully defended their title after a 1–1 draw at Metalac Gornji Milanovac with one match left to play. It was their fourth consecutive Serbian title and their 23rd domestic championship.

Teams
Napredak Kruševac and Mladi Radnik were relegated to the 2010–11 Serbian First League after the 2009–10 season for finishing in 15th and 16th place, respectively. Napredak completed a four-year tenure in the league, while Mladi Radnik had to immediately return to the First League.

The relegated teams were replaced by 2009–10 First League champions Inđija and runners-up Sevojno. Inđija made their debut at the highest football league of Serbia.

Soon after their promotion from the First League, Sevojno were merged with Užice city rivals Sloboda, who competed in the third-tier Srpska Liga during the 2009–10 season, to form FK Sloboda Point Sevojno. The newly formed club hence were the first sides from Užice to compete at the highest level of football in fourteen years.

League table

Results

Top goalscorers

Including matches played on 29 May 2011; Sources: Superliga official website, soccerway.com

Notes
 Teams for which that player played during 2010–11 season.

Hat-tricks

Awards
The selection was made among the coaches of all the clubs playing in the SuperLiga.

Young Player of the Season
The Young Player of the Season was awarded to Slobodan Medojević (Vojvodina).

Team of the Season

Attendance
The 2010–11 season saw an average attendance by club:

Champion Squad

References

External links
 Official Site
 Statistics

Serbian SuperLiga seasons
1
Serbia